is a Japanese football player for Shonan Bellmare.

Career
After being part of Cerezo Osaka youth ranks and attending Higashiyama High School, Ikeda joined Fukushima United FC in January 2018.

Club statistics
Updated to 15 Ocrober 2022.

References

External links

Profile at J. League
Profile at Fukushima United FC

1999 births
Living people
Association football people from Osaka Prefecture
Japanese footballers
J3 League players
Fukushima United FC players
Shonan Bellmare players
Association football forwards